Khairan Eroza Razali (born 5 May 1979) Malaysian footballer currently playing for Penang FA. He plays as a defensive midfielder. His previous club is Kelantan and Pahang.

External links
 Player Summary Khairan Eroza Razali
 

1979 births
Living people
Malaysian footballers
Association football midfielders
Kelantan FA players
Sri Pahang FC players
Penang F.C. players
People from Kota Bharu
People from Kelantan